Jayamala is an Indian actress and politician. She served as the Minister for Women and Child Development and Empowerment of Differently Abled and Senior Citizens in the Government of Karnataka, by virtue of being a member of the Karnataka Legislative Council. She served as the female president of the Karnataka Film Chamber of Commerce between 2008 and 2010. Her popular Kannada films include Premada Kanike, Shankar Guru, Antha and Chandi Chamundi among several others. She has produced and acted in the award-winning Thaayi Saheba.

Personal life
Jayamala was born to a Tulu speaking family in Mangalore. Her father G. Omaiah was an agriculturist and mother Kamalamma, a homemaker. She has six sisters and a brother. They moved to Chikmagalur in 1963 after being displaced due to the harbour work in Panambur.

She was first married to Kannada Film actor Tiger Prabhakar. and the couple has a daughter Soundarya, a popular actress in her own right. After  her divorce  she married cinematographer H. M. Ramachandra.

Film career

Jayamala has acted in several movies mainly in Kannada. Jayamala was the most glamorous heroine of Kannada cinema during the early 1980s. She started her career as a Rajkumar heroine and after a string of successful movies with him went on to star opposite all the top heroes of Sandalwood, With Anant Nag, she has acted in romantic movies as Janma Janmada Anubandha and Premave Baalina Belaku. With Vishnuvardhan, she starred in multi-starrer pot-boilers like Hanthakana Sanchu, Naga Kala Bhairava and Sididedda Sahodara. Her pairing with Ambareesh, started with the cult classic Antha where she played the tragic role of a cabaret dancer who is his sister and then went on to become his heroine in several movies like Ajith, Prema Matsara and Khadeema Kallaru. Her pairing with Shankar Nag in many movies also proved successful, including the heroine-oriented Chandi Chamundi that made her a household name as an action heroine.

Her last successful pairing was with Prabhakar, (who incidentally had played her brother in Chandi Chamundi)  whom she married in 1985 after which she quit films. Interestingly Jayamala and top heroine Aarathi  costarred in nine films with Jayamala's glamour quotient complementing Aarathi's simple-girl appeal.

Her first production venture Thaayi Saheba was directed by Girish Kasaravalli and won a National award. Jayamala received a special jury award for her performance in the film. Jayamala created history of sorts when she became the only actress in the Indian film industry to be conferred a doctorate for writing a thesis. Her thesis was on the rehabilitation of rural woman in Karnataka and required her to tour Karnataka and also scrutinise several documents. The Doctorate was conferred by the Bangalore University on 18 January 2008 and presented by former President Dr A P J Abdul Kalam.

Controversy
She was at the center of a controversy when she claimed that she touched the Lord Ayyappa idol in Sabarimala during the  shooting of Tamil movie titled 'Nambinar Keduvathillai'. Women from the age 10–50 are banned from entering Sabarimala temple. It created a furor in India and led to ideological warfare in Indian media and courts. It was Mr V Rajendran who is currently the Kerala state committee member of Bharatiya Janata Party who filed the petition against her in Ranni court. Jayamala has said she regretted her action, but clarified that she was pushed into the shrine by a crowd of devotees. Rajendran insisted that it is impossible to touch as the shrine is located far inside the Garbhagriha. The Supreme Priest of Sabarimala Kantararu Maheshwararu had dismissed the actress's statement as a figment of her imagination.

Filmography

Kannada films

Tamil
 Oru Kodiyil Iru Malargal (1976)
 Jamboo (1980)
 Bhama Rukmani (1980)
 Andru Muthal Indru Varai (1981)
 Kadavulin Theerpu (1981)
 Kalthoon (1981)
 Asthivaram (1982)
 Kann Sivanthaal Mann Sivakkum (1983) as Valli
 Thalaimagan (1983)
 Kuvaa Kuvaa Vaaththukkal (1984)
 Pozhuthu Vidinchachu (1984)
 Padikkadha Pannaiyar (1985)
 Nambinar Keduvathillai (1986)
 En Pondatti Nallava (1995) as Mayilu

Malayalam: Credited as Jayanthi
 Devalokam (Unreleased)
 Makara Vilakku (1980)
 Oridathoru Phayalvaan (1981) as Chakkara
 Sindoora Sandhyakku Mounam (1982)
 Kadamba (1983)
 Rishi (1992)

Telugu
 Rakshasudu (1986)
 Bhale Ramudu (1966)

References

20th-century scandals
People from Dakshina Kannada district
Tulu people
Kannada people
Indian film actresses
Living people
Actresses in Kannada cinema
Actresses in Telugu cinema
Actresses in Tamil cinema
Actresses in Malayalam cinema
Year of birth missing (living people)
Filmfare Awards South winners
Actresses from Karnataka
20th-century Indian actresses
21st-century Indian actresses
Special Jury Award (feature film) National Film Award winners
Producers who won the Best Feature Film National Film Award
Producers who won the Best Film on Environment Conservation/Preservation National Film Award